Malcolm George Page, OAM (born 22 March 1972) is an Australian professional sailor and gold medalist at the 2008 and 2012 Olympic Games.

Personal life
Page was educated at St Andrew's Cathedral School in Sydney. After retiring from Olympic sailing, Page went on to work for World Sailing as Head of Media, before becoming Chief of Olympic Sailing for US Sailing. He then returned to Australia as the Head Coach of the Victorian Institute of Sport Sailing program. He is currently coaching with the Australian Sailing Team.

Career highlights

Olympics
 2012 Olympics - 1st  - 470 with Mathew Belcher
 2008 Olympics - 1st  - 470 with Nathan Wilmot
 2004 Olympics - 12th - 470 with Nathan Wilmot

Page won five world titles with teammate Nathan Wilmot. The pair also won the Olympic test event in Qingdao and were considered favourites to win the 470 event at the 2008 Summer Olympics. Following Wilmot's retirement, Page partnered with Mathew Belcher, and again won gold in the 470 class at the 2012 Summer Olympics in London.

Page was the official Australian flag bearer at the closing ceremony  of the London Olympics.

World Championships

International 470 Class

Nationals
2010 - 470 Australian National Championship - Gold
2009 - 470 Australian National Championship - Gold
2008 - 470 Australian National Championship - Gold
2006 – 470 Australian National Championship - Gold
2005 – 470 Australian National Championship - Gold
2004 – 470 Australian National Championship - Gold
2003 – 470 Australian National Championship - Gold
2002 – 470 French National Championship - Gold
2002 – 470 Australian National Championship - Gold 
2001 – 470 Australian National Championship – Gold
2009 – Australian Sydney 38 Class - Gold
2006 – Australian Champion Sydney 38 Class - Gold
1986 – Australian National Championship Manly Junior Class - Gold
1991 - Australian National Championship Flying 11 Class - Gold

Others 
2010 - 1st Taser - World Master Games, double handed +45 - helmed by Martin Hill
1995 – 18 ft Skiff Grand Prix circuit

Awards and committees
2013 World Sailing Athlete Commission Chair
2009 Australian Yachtsman of the Year
2003, 04, 05, 06, 08, 09 Australian Yachtsman Finalist
2004 & 05 Yachting NSW Yachtsperson of the Year
2005, 07 & 08 Australian Institute of Sport Team of the Year
2005, 07 & 08 New South Wales Institute of Sport Team of the Year
2005, 07 & 08 New South Wales Sport Team of the Year
2005 Australia Sports Team Finalist
2009, 10 Australian Sports Commission Athletes Commission
2009, 10, 11, 12 Member ISAF Athletes Commission
2011 Australian Institute of Sport (AIS) 'Best of the Best'
2016 Sport Australia Hall of Fame Athlete Member

References

External links

 
 
 
 
 
 
 

1972 births
Living people
Australian male sailors (sport)
Male sailors
Olympic sailors of Australia
Olympic gold medalists for Australia
Olympic medalists in sailing
Sailors at the 2004 Summer Olympics – 470
Sailors at the 2008 Summer Olympics – 470
Sailors at the 2012 Summer Olympics – 470
Medalists at the 2012 Summer Olympics
Medalists at the 2008 Summer Olympics
Australian Institute of Sport sailors
World champions in sailing for Australia
420 class world champions
470 class world champions
Sport Australia Hall of Fame inductees
Recipients of the Medal of the Order of Australia
21st-century Australian people